Nuggets & Doozies is a concert video by the Minneapolis-based noise rock band Cows, released on October 17, 1995 by Amphetamine Reptile Records.

Track listing

Release history

References 

1995 video albums
1995 live albums
Live video albums